is a compilation album by Japanese duo Pink Lady. The album was released on December 1, 1990.

Track listing 
 
 "S.O.S."
 
 
 
 "UFO"
 
 
 
 
 
 
 
 "Kiss in the Dark"
 
 
 
 
 
 
 
 "OH!"

References

External links

1990 greatest hits albums
Pink Lady (band) compilation albums
Victor Entertainment compilation albums